Tanganyicia rufofilosa is a species of tropical freshwater snail with an operculum, an aquatic gastropod mollusk in the family Paludomidae.

Before 2002, this species was placed within the family Thiaridae.

Distribution 
Tanganyicia rufofilosa is endemic to Lake Tanganyika. It is found in Burundi, the Democratic Republic of the Congo, Tanzania, and Zambia. The type locality is Lake Tanganyika.

Description 
The shape of the shell is ovate conic.

Ecology 
The natural habitat of this snail is freshwater lakes. Tanganyicia rufofilosa lives in depths  on silty and sandy bottoms, in high population densities.

The females are viviparous.

In 1996, this was considered an Endangered Species. Its survival is threatened mainly by sedimentation. The habitats of this species are damaged by settlements and other disturbances.

References

Further reading 
 Moore J. E. S. (1899). "The mollusks of the Great African lakes. 3. Tanganyicia rufofilosa, and the genus Spekia". Quarterly Journal of Microscopical Science 42: 155-185. Plates 14-19. PDF.
 Smith E. A. (1881). "On a collection of shells from lakes Tanganyika and Nyassa and other localities in East Africa". Proceedings of the Zoological Society of London 1881: 276-300. Plates 32-34. page 288. Plate 33, Figure 20, 20a.

Paludomidae
Gastropods described in 1880
Taxa named by Edgar Albert Smith
Taxonomy articles created by Polbot
Snails of Lake Tanganyika